The Church of St. Mary, Mother of the Church is a Roman Catholic parish church under the authority of the Roman Catholic Archdiocese of New York, located in Fishkill, Dutchess County, New York. It was originally established as a mission of St. Joachim (Beacon, New York) in 1861, and elevated to parish status in 1953.

Pastors
Monsignor Francis McKeon (1953-1964)
Monsignor Bernard Fleming (1964-1981)
Monsignor Charles P. Quinn (1982-1994)
Monsignor Joseph Martin (1994 - 2013)
Father Joseph A. Blenkle (2013 - present)

References

External links
St. Mary, Mother of the Church website

Religious organizations established in 1861
Roman Catholic churches in New York (state)
Churches in Dutchess County, New York
1861 establishments in New York (state)